Lubatowa  is a village in the administrative district of Gmina Iwonicz-Zdrój, within Krosno County, Subcarpathian Voivodeship, in south-eastern Poland.

The village has a population of 3,700. The Olympian Czesław Zając was born here.

References

Villages in Krosno County
Nazi war crimes in Poland